Eduan Lubbe (born 12 August 1997) is a South African rugby union player for the  in the Currie Cup. His regular position is flanker.

Lubbe was named in the  squad for the 2021 Currie Cup Premier Division.

References

South African rugby union players
1997 births
Living people
Rugby union flankers
Blue Bulls players